Structural ritualization theory, a concept related to the fields of sociology and social psychology, emphasizes embedded groups. These are groups located in a larger environment. The taken-for-granted practices of people in these groups are similar to patterns of behavior in the larger environment. When routinely performed, their actions acquire symbolic significance. They become part of a cognitive script that dictates behavior. The members of embedded groups do not just copy the practices. They express them in ways that may confirm patterns of behavior in the larger environment. In other words, the larger environment feeds the embedded group.

Ritualized symbolic practices

With the theory, ritualized symbolic practices (RSPs) are socially standardized actions that are schema-driven. The term schema refers to a cognitive structure or framework. According to the theory, ritual actions shape an actor's thoughts. This helps structural reproduction take place in specific domains of interaction. A domain of interaction is a bounded social arena which contains two or more actors engaged in face-to-face interaction

Structural reproduction

Four factors play an essential role in structural reproduction involving RSPs. They include repetitiveness, salience, homologousness, and resources. Repetitiveness entails the frequency with which an RSP is performed. Salience involves the degree to which an RSP is perceived to be central to an act, action sequence, or bundle of interrelated acts. 
Homologousness implies a similarity among different RSPs. Resources are materials needed to engage in RSPs which are available to actors. The greater the availability of resources, the more likely an actor will engage in an RSP.

Rank

With the theory, rank is important. Rank involves the standing of an RSP in terms of its dominance. A RSP has a high rank, and is likely to be repeated, if repetitiveness, salience, homologousness, and resources are all present. 
Empirical investigations have been carried out providing tests of the theory. They focus on:

1. Deritualization

2. Ritualized Practices in Organizations and Communities

3. Reproduction of Ritualized Behaviors within Groups

4. Strategic Ritualization and Power

5. Collective Ritual Events

6. Applied Research and Social Policy

References
Knottnerus, J. David. 1997. "The Theory of Structural Ritualization." pp. 257–279 in 
Advances in Group Processes, Volume 14, edited by Barry Markovsky, Michael J. Lovaglia and Lisa Troyer. Greenwich, CT: JAI Press.

External links
 http://www.sociological-imagination.com/knottnerusresources.pdf

Group processes